The 2019–20 Gwynedd League, known as The Cynghrair Peldroed Gwynedd Football League for sponsorship reasons, is the 37th season of the Gwynedd League, which is in the fifth level of the Welsh football pyramid.

There are fifteen teams in the division, with the champions promoted to the Welsh Alliance League and the bottom two teams relegated to the Anglesey League. 

The season commenced on 10 August 2019.

Teams 
Menai Bridge Tigers were champions in the previous season, however runners-up Gwalchmai gained promotion to the Welsh Alliance League Division 2 after Menai Bridge Tigers were refused promotion by the FAW due to inadequate toilet facilities.

Bangor 1876 a new club founded by the supporters of Bangor City and Bethesda Athletic joined the league at the start of the season.

Anglesey League Champions, Bryngwran Bulls and Runner's up, Caergybi gained promotion to the Gwynedd League.

During the pre-season Bryngwran Bulls and Trearddur Bay United merged to form Trearddur Bay Bulls.

Llannerch-y-medd joined the Gwynedd League after resigning from the Welsh Alliance League due to losing the entire squad of players from the previous season for various reasons.

Grounds and locations

League table

Results

References

Gwynedd League seasons
2019–20 in Welsh football